Plestiodon tamdaoensis, the Vietnam skink, is a species of lizard which is found in Vietnam and China.

References

tamdaoensis
Reptiles described in 1937
Taxa named by René Léon Bourret